The Gander Flyers (also commonly known as the Kelly Ford Gander Flyers due to a sponsorship deal beginning October 3, 2014) are a senior ice hockey team based in Gander, Newfoundland and Labrador  and a member of in the Central West Senior Hockey League. Gander has been associated with Newfoundland senior hockey since 1947 when their first all-star team joined the Central Division of the Newfoundland Amateur Hockey Association.

Table key

NAHA Central Division (1947-1953)

Note: GP = Games played, W = Wins, L = Losses, T = Ties, OTL = Overtime Losses, Pts = Points, GF = Goals for, GA = Goals against

NAHA = Newfoundland Amateur Hockey Association

Notes (1947–1953)
From the winter of 1947 to the end of the 1949-50 season, Gander competed in the Central Division of the Newfoundland Senior League with Grand Falls, Buchans and Bishop's Falls. Beginning in 1950 and through the 1952-1953 season, Gander competed in the Western Division with Corner Brook, Buchans and Grand Falls. There was no regular season during this period.  The all-stars played a series of exhibition games and then competed in pre-determined playoff format to decide the champions who would advance to the all-Newfoundland Herder finals against the Eastern champions.

NAHA Section B (1953-1959)

Note: GP = Games played, W = Wins, L = Losses, T = Ties, OTL = Overtime Losses, Pts = Points, GF = Goals for, GA = Goals against

NAHA-B = Newfoundland Amateur Hockey Association Section B

Notes (1953-1959)
From 1953-54 to 1958-59, the Gander all-stars played in the Section B division of the Newfoundland Amateur Hockey Association where teams were not permitted to have paid import players on their rosters. With no regular season during this period, the all-stars played a series of exhibition games and then competed in the Section B playoffs for the Evening Telegram Trophy.
The all-stars did not enter Section B playoffs in 1955-56. A new Gander Gardens was being built in the old RCAF Recreation Hall on Foss Avenue that would have Gander's first artificial ice surface. following the opening of the new Gardens in March, the All-Stars played a series of exhibition games with invited teams and re-joined Section B for 1956-57.

NAHA Western Division (1959-1962)

Note: GP = Games played, W = Wins, L = Losses, T = Ties, OTL = Overtime Losses, Pts = Points, GF = Goals for, GA = Goals against

NAHA = Newfoundland Amateur Hockey Association

From 1959–60 to 1961–62, the Gander all-stars played in the Western Division of the Newfoundland Amateur Hockey Association. There were no regular season games during this period but a 12-game triple round-robin divisional playoffs. The first place team after the round robin playoffs played the Eastern Divisional playoffs champion in a 7-game Herder final series.

NSHL (1962-1983)

Note: GP = Games played, W = Wins, L = Losses, T = Ties, OTL = Overtime losses, Pts = Points, GF = Goals for, GA = Goals against, DNQ = Did not qualify, NSHL = Newfoundland Senior Hockey League

CBSHL/AWSHL (1983-1996)

Note: GP = Games played, W = Wins, L = Losses, T = Ties, OTL = Overtime Losses, Pts = Points, GF = Goals for, GA = Goals against

CBSHL = Central Beothuck Senior Hockey League, AWSHL = Avalon West Senior Hockey League

CNHL (2009-2012)

Note: GP = Games played, W = Wins, L = Losses, T = Ties, OTL = Overtime Losses, Pts = Points, GF = Goals for, GA = Goals against

CNHL = Central Newfoundland Hockey League

For three seasons the Flyers played in a league that was not eligible for Herder Competition.

NSHL/CWSHL (2012-present)

Note: GP = Games played, W = Wins, L = Losses, T = Ties, OTL = Overtime Losses, Pts = Points, GF = Goals for, GA = Goals against

NSHL = Newfoundland Senior Hockey League, CWSHL = Central West Senior Hockey League

References

Bibliography

Ice hockey in Newfoundland and Labrador
Ice hockey teams in Newfoundland and Labrador
Newfoundland and Labrador sport-related lists
Canadian ice hockey-related lists